The 2019 Esiliiga B was the 7th season of the Esiliiga B, third-highest Estonian league for association football clubs, since its establishment in 2013.

Teams
Of the 10 participating teams 5 remained following the 2018 Esiliiga B. The 2018 champions Legion, runners-up Tammeka U21 and 3rd placed Järve were promoted to Esiliiga, while 9th and 10th placed Ajax and Flora U19 were relegated to II liiga. They are replaced by Viimsi JK, who returned after a year in the lower leagues, Põhja-Tallinna JK Volta and Tabasalu JK, who are making their debut in the top leagues. Volta and Viimsi both finished the last season on top of their leagues and Tabasalu defeated Ajax in the play-offs. The teams which were relegated from higher tiers were Nõmme Kalju FC U21  and Keila JK, who both got to play a season in Esiliiga. Keila lost in the play-offs against Järve.

Stadia

Personnel and kits

Managerial changes

Results

League table

Results tables

First half of the season

Second half of the season

Season statistics

Top scorers

Awards

Monthly awards

See also
 2018–19 Estonian Cup
 2019–20 Estonian Cup
 2019 Meistriliiga
 2019 Esiliiga

References

External links
Official website

Esiliiga B seasons
3
Estonia
2019–20 in European third tier association football leagues